Francisco Javier Ferrán Larraz (born August 1956) is a Spanish businessman. He was president and chief executive officer (CEO) of Bacardi from 2003 to 2004.

Ferrán has been the chairman of Diageo since January 2017, when Franz Humer retired.

Early life
Ferrán was born in August 1956. He graduated from the University of Barcelona and received a BA and MBA from ESADE, in Barcelona. He later earned an MA in Computer Information Systems from the University of Miami in 1984.

Career
From 1979 to 1984, he worked for Lloyds TSB, including two years as vice President of the Miami, Florida branch. He joined Martini & Rossi in 1985, where he later served as Managing Director. He joined Bacardi in 1992, and served as regional president for Europe, Middle East and Africa from 1994. He served as president and CEO from March 2003 to November 2004.

Since 2019, he has served as an operating partner with BlackRock's private equity fund. He was previously a partner of the London-based private equity firm Lion Capital LLP from 2005 to 2019. He is also on the board of directors of Associated British Foods and Agrolimen.

References

1956 births
Associated British Foods people
Bacardi people
ESADE alumni
Living people
Spanish businesspeople
University of Barcelona alumni
University of Miami alumni
Spanish chief executives
Spanish chairpersons of corporations
Diageo people